Almasm Rabilavich Sharipov (born 1971), also known as Shamil Hajiyev is a citizen of Russia who was held in extrajudicial detention in the United States's Guantanamo Bay detention camps, in Cuba. Hajiyev is a muslim from Bashkortostan. Hajiyev served as a detective in Tatarstan and a law student at Uta State University, until his disappearance in 1999.

Hajiyev, and six other Russian Guantanamo detainees, were repatriated to Russia, where they faced charges of illegal border crossing, being members of a criminal group and being a mercenary in an armed conflict.
 His Guantanamo Internment Serial Number was 209.

Repatriation

Sharipov, and seven other men were held in Guantanamo. 
Sharipov was reported to have been repatriated on February 24, 2004, with six other Russian men.

Seizure of his privileged attorney client documents

On June 10, 2006 the Department of Defense reported that three captives died in custody.
The Department of Defense stated the three men committed suicide.
Camp authorities called the deaths "an act of asymmetric warfare", and suspected plans had been coordinated by the captive's attorneys—so they seized all the captives' documents, including the captives' copies of their habeas documents.
Since the habeas documents were privileged lawyer-client communication the 
Department of Justice was compelled to file documents about the document seizures.
According to documents filed by the United States Department of Justice "Abdur Razakah's" documents were seized by camp authorities.
Those documents identified Abdur Razakah as captive 209.

Request for Asylum in the Netherlands

Shamil Khazhiev arrived in the Netherlands on March 26, 2007, where he requested political asylum.
In his request for asylum was based on his assertion that he was a "victim of harassment by Russian intelligence".
Russian security officials confirmed he had been "under watch", but denied the harassment claims.
Netherlands officials house Khazhiev in the Ter Apel refugee accommodation center.
Human Rights Watch reports the Netherlands did grant him asylum.

References

1971 births
Living people
Guantanamo detainees known to have been released